Carlos Leal (born 9 July 1969) is a Swiss rapper and actor.

Leal was born in Lausanne to Galician immigrants. In 1990, he co-founded Sens Unik. The group produced four gold records and contributed music to the films La Haine (1995) and Neutre (2001).

He produced videos with Sens Unik, and after making an appearance in the documentary Babylon 2 (1993), Leal decided to pursue a serious acting career. He trained under director Jack Garfein at The Actors Studio in Paris. He made his film debut in Week End Break (2002), a comedy short film, which led to roles in a number of French and Swiss productions.

In 2005, Leal appeared in the Swiss film Snow White, in his first major cinematic role. For his performance, he was awarded the prize for Best Actor at the Africa Film Festival, and Swiss Film Prize for Best Performance in a Leading Role.

In 2006, Leal played the role of croupier and poker tournament organizer in the James Bond film Casino Royale.
In 2020, he portrayed Max Epperson aka Bob Weir, in the Netflix film The Last Thing He Wanted.

Filmography 

 Week End Break (Switzerland, short subject, 2002) - Phil
 Anomalies passagères (France, TV, 2003) - Le photographe
 Les Amateurs (2003) - Britannicus
 Hildes Reise (Switzerland, 2004) - Monk at monastery
 Love Express (Switzerland, 2004) - Al
 Visite Médicale (Switzerland/France, short subject, 2005) - Le suisse
 Snow White (Switzerland, 2005) - Paco
 Casino Royale (USA, 2006) - Tournament Director
 L'Écart (2007) - Chemist
 El internado (Spain, 2007) - Jaques Noiret
 Chef's Special (2008) - Pascal Sánchez
 Dirty Money l'infiltré (2008) 
 Broken Embraces (2009)
 Verso (2009) - Victor Preiswerk
 El mal ajeno (2010) - Armand
 The Way (2010) - Jean
 Sennentuntschi (Switzerland/Germany, 2011) - Martin
 La rosa de nadie (2011) - DANIEL
 There Be Dragons (2011) - Captain Jorge
 CHAOS (USA, 2011) - Luc Mounia
 Carré Blanc (France, 2011) - Jean Luc
 Looking for Eimish (Spain, 2012) - Kai
 Escape from Tibet (Switzerland/Germany, 2011) - Jean François
 Collision (2013) - Cyril
 Who Killed Johnny (2013) - Marcel, Carlos
 Oro verde (2014) - Augusto
 20 Rules for Sylvie (Switzerland, 2013) - Adalbert
 The Team (TV series, 2015) - Jean-Louis Poquelin
 Spaceman (2016) - Gino Lapue
 Training Day (TV series, 2017) - Comandante Felix Ruiz "El Jaguar"
 Shooter (TV series, 2017) - Banker for Atlas

 Better Call Saul (TV series, 2018) - Foreign engineer

References

External links
 

1969 births
Living people
Swiss male rappers
Swiss male film actors
Swiss people of Galician descent
Swiss people of Spanish descent
Swiss male television actors
People from Lausanne